Tractors and Farm Equipment Limited (TAFE) is an Indian agricultural machinery manufacturer based in Chennai, India. TAFE is the third-largest tractor manufacturer in the world and the second largest in India by volume.

Description

TAFE – Tractors and Farm Equipment Limited, is an Indian tractor manufacturer incorporated in 1960 at Chennai, with an annual turnover of INR 10,000 crores. The third-largest tractor manufacturer in the world and the second largest in India by volumes, TAFE wields about 25% market share of the Indian tractor industry with a sale of over 180,000 tractors (domestic and international) annually. TAFE's partnership with AGCO Corporation and the Massey Ferguson brand for over 60 years is a stellar example of its commitment to building long-term relationships with its stakeholders, through fair and ethical business practices. TAFE is also a significant shareholder in AGCO Corporation, USA – a US $11.1 billion tractor and agricultural equipment manufacturer.

TAFE has a  distribution network of over 1600 dealers which sells its tractor brands under four iconic brands– Massey Ferguson, TAFE Tractors, Eicher Tractors and IMT . TAFE exports tractors, and independently, for use in farms in over 100 countries all over the world.

Besides tractors, TAFE and its subsidiaries have business interests in areas such as farm-machinery, diesel engines and gensets, engineering plastics, gears and transmission components, batteries, hydraulic pumps and cylinders, passenger vehicle franchises and plantations.

TAFE's plant at Turkey manufactures a range of tractors for distribution in Turkey through AGCO's dealer network. TAFE acquired Eicher's tractors, gears and transmission components and engines business in 2005 through a wholly owned subsidiary, TAFE Motors and Tractors Limited (TMTL). With six tractor plants, an engines plant, two gears and transmission components plants, two engineering plastics units, two facilities for hydraulic pumps and cylinders and a batteries plant besides other facilities, TAFE employs over 3,500 engineers, as well as  a number of specialists in other disciplines.

TAFE is a part of The Amalgamations Group based at Chennai, one of India's largest light engineering groups, comprising 40 companies, involved in the design, development and manufacture of diesel engines, automobile components, light engineering goods, plantations and services.

See also

References

Agricultural machinery manufacturers of India
Tractor manufacturers of India
Indian brands
Manufacturing companies based in Chennai
Indian companies established in 1960
1960 establishments in Madras State
Vehicle manufacturing companies established in 1960